This is a list of administrative units of Pakistan by elevation.

Federal Capital

Autonomous territories

Provinces

{| class="wikitable sortable"
! Rank
! Province
! Peak
! Range/Region
! data-sort-type="numeric" | Height (m)
! data-sort-type="numeric" | Height (ft)
! Location
|-
|1
|Khyber Pakhtunkhwa
|Tirich Mir
|Hindu kush
|7,708 
|25,230 
|It is located in Chitral district.
|-
|2
|Balochistan
|Loe Nekan
|Zarghun Ghar
|3,578
|11,739
|It is located in Quetta district.
|-
|3
|Sindh
|Zardak Peak
|Kirthar Mountains
|2,787
|8,895
|It is located in Dadu District.
|-
|4
|Punjab
|Kashmir Point
|Himalaya
|2,260
|7,417
|It is located in Rawalpindi district.

References

Pakistani by province
Mountains of Pakistan by administrative unit
Lists of mountains of Pakistan